Hydrobia is a genus of very small brackish water snails with a gill and an operculum,  aquatic gastropod mollusks in the family Hydrobiidae.

Species
Species within the genus Hydrobia include:

† Hydrobia abbreviata (Grateloup, 1827)
† Hydrobia acheila Brusina, 1902
Hydrobia aciculina (Bourguignat, 1876)
Hydrobia acuta (Draparnaud, 1805)
 subspecies Hydrobia acuta neglecta Muus, 1963 - synonym: Hydrobia neglecta Muus, 1963
† Hydrobia acutecarinata Neumayr in Neumayr & Paul, 1875
† Hydrobia aitai Jekelius, 1932
† Hydrobia alpha Jekelius, 1944
† Hydrobia alutae Jekelius, 1932
† Hydrobia andreaei Boettger in Degrange-Touzin, 1892
† Hydrobia andrussowi Hilber, 1897
Hydrobia antarctica Philippi, 1868
† Hydrobia aquitanica Degrange-Touzin, 1892
† Hydrobia atropida Brusina, 1892
† Hydrobia aturensis Noulet, 1854
† Hydrobia aurita Neumayr in Neumayr & Paul, 1875
† Hydrobia avisanensis Fontannes, 1877
† Hydrobia baltici Brusina, 1902
† Hydrobia banatica Jekelius, 1944
† Hydrobia barzaviae Jekelius, 1932
† Hydrobia bathyomphala Brusina, 1902
† Hydrobia bialozurkensis (Montpéreux, 1831)
† Hydrobia bicristata Simionescu & Barbu, 1940
† Hydrobia brusinai Wenz, 1919
† Hydrobia caerulescens (Gmelin, 1791)
† Hydrobia calderoni Royo Gómez, 1922
† Hydrobia carinata Gillet & Geissert, 1971
† Hydrobia cestasensis Cossmann & Peyrot, 1918
† Hydrobia cingulata Capellini, 1880
† Hydrobia cubillensis (Almera & Bofill y Poch, 1895)
† Hydrobia detracta Jekelius, 1944
† Hydrobia ditropida Brusina, 1892
Hydrobia djerbaensis Wilke, Pfenninger & Davis, 2002
† Hydrobia dollfusi Wenz, 1913
† Hydrobia draparnaldii (Nyst, 1836)
† Hydrobia dubuissoni (Bouillet, 1834)
† Hydrobia effusa (Frauenfeld in Hörnes, 1856)
† Hydrobia enikalensis Kolesnikov, 1935
† Hydrobia euryomphala (Bourguignat, 1876)
† Hydrobia falsani (Fontannes, 1876)
† Hydrobia fischeri (Hermitte, 1879)
† Hydrobia fraasi (Blanckenhorn, 1897)
† Hydrobia frauenfeldi (Hörnes, 1856)
† Hydrobia friedbergi Simionescu & Barbu, 1940
† Hydrobia gibba (Braun in Walchner, 1851)
† Hydrobia girondica Boettger in Degrange-Touzin, 1892
Hydrobia glaucovirens (Melvill & Ponsonby, 1896)
Hydrobia glyca (Servain, 1880)
† Hydrobia gracilis (Rolle, 1860)
† Hydrobia grandis Cobălcescu, 1883
† Hydrobia gregaria (Schlotheim, 1820)
† Hydrobia hermitei Wenz, 1919
† Hydrobia hoernesi Friedberg, 1923
† Hydrobia inflata (Pusch, 1837)
Hydrobia knysnaensis (Krauss, 1848)
† Hydrobia kubanica Zhizhchenko, 1936
Hydrobia lactea (Küster, 1852)
† Hydrobia limnicola (Rolle, 1860)
† Hydrobia lineata Jekelius, 1944
† Hydrobia longaeva Neumayr in Neumayr & Paul, 1875
† Hydrobia metochiana Pavlović, 1932
† Hydrobia minutissima (Grateloup, 1838)
† Hydrobia moesiacensis Jekelius, 1944
† Hydrobia morasensis Fontannes, 1883
† Hydrobia morgani Morgan, 1920
† Hydrobia mucronata Jekelius, 1944
† Hydrobia nannacus Kadolsky, 2008
† Hydrobia obtusa (Sandberger, 1858)
† Hydrobia onuri Taner, 1974
† Hydrobia paludinaria (Schlotheim, 1820)
† Hydrobia peregrina Boettger, 1901
† Hydrobia pisana Wenz, 1924
† Hydrobia planata (Montpéreux, 1831)
† Hydrobia podolica Łomnicki, 1886
† Hydrobia politioanei Jekelius, 1944
† Hydrobia polytropida Brusina, 1892
† Hydrobia pontilitoris Wenz, 1942
† Hydrobia procera (Mayer, 1864)
† Hydrobia protracta (Eichwald, 1853)
† Hydrobia pseudocaspia Sinzov in Davitashvili, 1932
† Hydrobia pseudocornea Brusina, 1902
† Hydrobia punctum (Eichwald, 1853)
† Hydrobia pupa (Sacco, 1895)
† Hydrobia pupula Brusina, 1874
† Hydrobia radmanyestensis Wenz, 1925
† Hydrobia reinachi Boettger in Reinach, 1894
† Hydrobia rhodiensis Tournouër in Fischer, 1877
† Hydrobia romani Royo Gómez, 1922
† Hydrobia rossii Brusina, 1878 †
† Hydrobia royoi Robles & Goy, 1972
† Hydrobia sacyi Cossmann & Peyrot, 1918
† Hydrobia santrici Pavlović, 1935
† Hydrobia schlosseri Royo Gómez, 1928
† Hydrobia semiconvexa Sandberger, 1875
† Hydrobia septemlineata Łomnicki, 1886
† Hydrobia simplex (Fuchs, 1877)
† Hydrobia sinjana Brusina, 1897
† Hydrobia slavonica Brusina, 1874
† Hydrobia soceni Jekelius, 1944
† Hydrobia spicula Ștefănescu, 1896
† Hydrobia stavropoliana Zhizhchenko, 1936
† Hydrobia striatella (Grateloup, 1838)
† Hydrobia subconoidalis Morgan, 1920
† Hydrobia subprotracta Zhizhchenko, 1936
† Hydrobia substriatula Sinzov, 1880
† Hydrobia subsuturata Jekelius, 1944
† Hydrobia subventrosa Gottschick, 1921
† Hydrobia sulculata Sandberger, 1875
† Hydrobia syrmica Neumayr in Neumayr & Paul, 1875
† Hydrobia tarchanensis Zhizhchenko, 1936
† Hydrobia timisiensis Jekelius, 1944
† Hydrobia tournoueri Sandberger, 1875
† Hydrobia trochulus Sandberger, 1875
† Hydrobia turrita (Grateloup, 1827)
† Hydrobia uiratamensis Kolesnikov, 1935
† Hydrobia vitrella Ștefănescu, 1896

Species brought into synonymy 
Hydrobia anatolica Schütt, 1965: synonym of Graecoanatolica anatolica (Schütt, 1965)
Hydrobia atuca Boeters, 1988: synonym of Ecrobia ventrosa (Montagu, 1803)
 Hydrobia caliginosa Gould, 1849: synonym of Laevilitorina caliginosa (Gould, 1849)
Hydrobia compacta Jeffreys, 1884 : synonym of Barleeia gougeti (Michaud, 1830)
Hydrobia costaricensis Mörch, 1860: synonym of Aroapyrgus costaricensis (Mörch, 1860)
† Hydrobia elongata carinulata Wenz, 1913: synonym of † Hydrobia gregaria (Schlotheim, 1820)
Hydrobia eutrepha Paladilhe, 1867: synonym of Bythinella eutrepha (Paladilhe, 1867)
Hydrobia georgiana Pfeffer, 1886: synonym of Eatoniella georgiana (Pfeffer, 1886)
Hydrobia jenkinsi E. A. Smith, 1889: synonym of Potamopyrgus antipodarum (Gray, 1843)
Hydrobia joossei van Aartsen, Menkhorst & Gittenberger, 1984: synonym of Hydrobia glyca (Servain, 1880)
Hydrobia limosa (Preston, 1915) : synonym of Littoridina limosa Preston, 1915
Hydrobia longiscata (Bourguignat, 1856) : synonym of Semisalsa longiscata (Bourguignat, 1856)
Hydrobia maritima Milaschewitsch, 1916: synonym of Ecrobia maritima (Milaschewitsch, 1916)
Hydrobia miliacea G. Nevill, 1880: synonym of Gangetia miliacea (G. Nevill, 1880)
Hydrobia minuta Totten : synonym of Ecrobia truncata (Vanatta, 1924)
Hydrobia neglecta Muus, 1963: synonym of Hydrobia acuta neglecta Muus, 1963
Hydrobia pamphylica Schütt, 1964: synonym of Graecoanatolica pamphylica (Schütt, 1964)
Hydrobia pontieuxini Radoman, 1973: synonym of Ecrobia maritima (Milaschewitsch, 1916)
Hydrobia procerula (Paladilhe, 1869): synonym of Hydrobia acuta acuta (Bourguignat, 1805)
Hydrobia pumilio E. A. Smith, 1875: synonym of Laevilacunaria antarctica (Martens, 1885)
Hydrobia salsa (Pilsbry, 1905): synonym of Spurwinkia salsa (Pilsbry, 1905)
Hydrobia scamandri (Boeters, Monod & Vala, 1977): synonym of Semisalsa stagnorum (Gmelin, 1791)
Hydrobia seemani Frauenfeld, 1863: synonym of Tryonia seemani (Frauenfeld, 1863)
Hydrobia stagnalis Baster, 1765 : synonym of  Heleobia stagnorum (Gmelin, 1791)
Hydrobia stagnorum (Gmelin, 1791) : synonym of Heleobia stagnorum (Gmelin, 1791)
Hydrobia steinii Martens, 1858: synonym of Marstoniopsis steinii (Martens, 1858)
Hydrobia striata (d’Orbigny, 1840): synonym of Onoba amissa Ponder & Worsfold, 1994
Hydrobia totteni Morrison, 1954 : synonym of Ecrobia truncata (Vanatta, 1924)
Hydrobia truncata (Vanatta, 1924): synonym of Ecrobia truncata (Vanatta, 1924)
Hydrobia turbinata Petterd, 1889: synonym of Ascorhis victoriae (Tenison-Woods, 1878)
Hydrobia ulvae (Pennant, 1777): synonym of Peringia ulvae (Pennant, 1777)
Hydrobia vegorriticola Schütt, 1962: synonym of Graecoanatolica vegorriticola (Schütt, 1962)
Hydrobia ventrosa (Montagu, 1803) : synonym of Ecrobia ventrosa (Montagu, 1803)
Hydrobia victoriae (Tenison-Woods, 1878): synonym of Ascorhis victoriae (Tenison-Woods, 1878)

References

 Taylor, J.D. (1973). Provisional list of the mollusca of Aldabra Atoll.
 Eneman, E. (1984). Uit het Natuurhistorisch Archief [From the Natural History Archive]. De Strandvlo 4(1): 4-17
 Vaught, K.C. (1989). A classification of the living Mollusca. American Malacologists: Melbourne, FL (USA). . XII, 195 pp.
 Gofas, S.; Le Renard, J.; Bouchet, P. (2001). Mollusca, in: Costello, M.J. et al. (Ed.) (2001). European register of marine species: a check-list of the marine species in Europe and a bibliography of guides to their identification. Collection Patrimoines Naturels, 50: pp. 180–213
 Rolán E., 2005. Malacological Fauna From The Cape Verde Archipelago. Part 1, Polyplacophora and Gastropoda

 
Hydrobiidae
Taxonomy articles created by Polbot